The Legend of White Fang is an animated television series based on the 1906 novel White Fang by Jack London. The show focuses on the main dog protagonist and a young human companion, 12-year-old female Wendy Scott, in the place of the novel's male trail guide, Weedon Scott. Spanning 26 episodes for one season.

Production
Quebec-based Cinar (now WildBrain) produced the series and writer/journalist/popular historian, Pierre Berton, was a history consultant for the series.

Plot
12-year-old Wendy, a brave and kind girl, befriends wolf-husky mix White Fang. They share many adventures in Yukon's rugged Klondike territory during the Klondike Gold Rush where they encounter wolf packs, gold thieves, First Nations people, otters, poachers and treacherous avalanches.

Voice cast
Mark Hellman as White Fang
Patricia Rodriguez as Wendy
Terrence Scammell as Weedon/Alex
Pierre Lenoir as Sgt. Oakes
Neil Shee as Raven Moon
Michael Rudder as Beauty Smith
Rick Jones as Matt
Thelma Farmer as She Wolf
Anik Matern as Jeannie/Bella
Eramelinda Boquer
Sonja Ball
A.J. Henderson
Thor Bishopric
Michael O'Reilly
Kathleen Fee
George Morris
Susan Glover
Richard Dumont
Vlasta Vrána
Harry Standjofski
Bronwen Mantel
Jeannie Walker
Daniel Brochu
Greg Morton
Liz MacRae
Maria Bircher
Norman Groulx
Gary Jewell
Gordon Masten
Alan Keiping Legros
Dean Hagopian
Pauline Little
Johni Keyworth
Arthur Holden
Teddy Lee Dillon
Ian Finlay
Jane Woods
Carlyle Miller

Episodes

Telecast and home media
The Legend of White Fang was first aired on the pay-TV network Family Channel in 1994. It also aired on Global Television Network and TF1 in France. HBO later broadcast in the U.S

Two volumes were released on DVD in 2006, each containing four episodes.

On 14 September 2010, Mill Creek Entertainment released the entire series on DVD in Region 1.

As of 2022, the full episodes were available on YouTube.

References

External links
White Fang at The Big Cartoon Database
White Fang at Toonariffic.com

1994 Canadian television series debuts
1994 Canadian television series endings
Global Television Network original programming
Family Channel (Canadian TV network) original programming
Canadian children's animated adventure television series
English-language television shows
French children's animated adventure television series
Royal Canadian Mounted Police in fiction
Animated television series about children
Animated television series about dogs
Television series by FilmFair
Television series by Cookie Jar Entertainment
White Fang
1990s Canadian animated television series
HBO original programming
Australian Broadcasting Corporation original programming
Channel 4 original programming
Television shows based on works by Jack London